Elections were held in Lambton County, Ontario on October 22, 2018 in conjunction with municipal elections across the province.

Lambton County Council
County council includes the mayors of each constituent municipality, the deputy mayors of Lambton Shores and St. Clair plus four city councillors from Sarnia.

Brooke-Alvinston

Mayor

Source:

Dawn-Euphemia

Mayor

Enniskillen

Mayor

Lambton Shores

Mayor

Source:

Oil Springs

Mayor

Petrolia

Mayor

Source:

Plympton-Wyoming

Mayor

Point Edward

Mayor

Sarnia
Source for unofficial results:

Mayor

Sarnia City Council

City and County
Four to be elected

City Council
Four to be elected

St. Clair

Mayor

Source:

Warwick

Mayor

Source:

References

Lambton
Lambton County